Crossed Lines is the second album by Australian rock band 78 Saab. It was released in October 2004.

Track listing
All tracks written by Ben Nash and 78 Saab, except where noted

 "No Illusions" – 3:36
 "Cops" – 3:42
 "Beat of Your Drum" – 3:55
 "Come On" – 4:08
 "All a Lie" – 5:50
 "The City is Humming" (B. Nash, J. Andrews, 78 Saab) – 2:58
 "High Above the World" – 3:33
 "We All Get By" – 4:06
 "Saviour" (B. Nash, J. Andrews, 78 Saab) – 3:51
 "You and Your Friends" – 4:36
 "Know What You Want" – 2:14

Personnel
 Jake Andrews — guitars, vocals, keyboards
 Nicholai Danko — drums, percussion
 Ben Nash — vocals, guitar
 Garth Tregillgas — bass

Additional musicians
 Stu Hunter — keyboards

References

2004 albums
78 Saab albums
Ivy League Records albums